Laurence David Skelly MLC is a Manx politician, who has served as President of Tynwald since July 2021.

Political career 
He was elected as one of the three MHKs for Rushen in 2011, with 19.4% of the vote and was re-elected in 2016 as one of the two members for the new Rushen constituency following the boundary review in 2013 with 21% of the vote.

In March 2014 he was appointed Minister for Infrastructure and following the resignation of John Shimmin in July of that year was appointed Minister for Economic Development.

Following the 2016 Manx general election, Skelly considered standing as Chief Minister but decided not to do so and instead continued to hold the Economic Development portfolio within the Howard Quayle administration.

In May 2021 he stated that he will not seek re-election in the 2021 Manx General Election but stated that he would stand for the position of President of Tynwald, the apolitical presiding officer of Tynwald Court and the Legislative Council.

In July 2021, Skelly was elected as President of Tynwald, succeeding Steve Rodan. He defeated Speaker of the House of Keys Juan Watterson by a vote of 20 to 12.

Election results

2011

2016 
In 2014, Tynwald approved recommendations from the Boundary Review Commission which saw the reform of the Island's electoral boundaries.

Under the new system, the Island was divided into 12 constituencies based on population, with each area represented by two members of the House of Keys.

As a result of these changes the constituency was reduced in size and lost one of its three MHKs.

Governmental positions 
Minister for Department of Economic Development, 2014–present

References 

Living people
Members of the House of Keys 2011–2016
Members of the House of Keys 2016–2021
1961 births